The Basilica of the Holy Spirit AKA Basilica of La Grita is a Catholic church, constructed in 1886, with the status of a minor basilica. It is located in the Plaza Bolivar of La Grita, capital of Jáuregui in the Táchira state, in the Andes of the South American country of Venezuela. The Basilica of the Holy Spirit houses the sacred image of the Holy Christ of La Grita.

It has a rectangular floorplan with a tower that is completed with a dome half circle, with concrete walls, blocks of clay and cement. Its windows have varieties of stained glass, carved wooden doors and granite floors. The interior of the basilica has three naves and a dome on the altar, which is marble, its 20 Gothic columns divide the ships.

See also
Roman Catholicism in Venezuela
Basilica of the National Shrine of Our Lady of Coromoto

References

Basilica churches in Venezuela
Roman Catholic churches completed in 1886
Buildings and structures in Táchira
19th-century Roman Catholic church buildings in Venezuela